Raúl Molina Martínez (born 1938)   was one of three Vice President of El Salvador from 2 May 1982 to 1 June 1984. During the presidency of Álvaro Magaña.

References

1938 births
Vice presidents of El Salvador
Living people